Xydakis is a Greek surname. It is the surname of:
 Nikos Xydakis (born 1952), a Greek composer, pianist, and singer
 Nikos Xydakis (born 1958), former editor in chief of Kathimerini and current Alternate Minister of Culture of Greece

Greek-language surnames
Surnames